The Paul J. Rainey Wildlife Sanctuary is a  refuge owned by the National Audubon Society in Vermilion Parish, Louisiana. Established in 1924, this private Louisiana sanctuary is home to alligator, deer, muskrat, otter, geese and many other species. Because of the focus to maintain safe, secure and healthy habitats for waterfowl and other endemic wildlife, it is not open to the public, and no hunting or fishing is permitted within the Sanctuary boundaries. There are no roads to the Sanctuary, and boat access through the private canals is by permission only. It is currently managed by Audubon Louisiana, a state office of the National Audubon Society.

References

External links
Louisiana Chapter of National Audubon Society list of centers and sanctuaries
PC Oil Drilling in a Wildlife Refuge, by Pamela S. Snyder and Jane S. Shaw
Paul J. Rainey Estate -Tippah Lodge
Report on the sanctuary after Hurricane Katrina
Audubon Society considers allowing oil and gas drilling at sanctuary in Vermilion Parish

Wildlife sanctuaries of the United States
Nature reserves in Louisiana
Protected areas of Vermilion Parish, Louisiana
National Audubon Society